Cape Ryugu is a rocky cape 7 nautical miles (13 km) northeast of Rakuda Rock on the coast of Queen Maud Land in Antarctica. Mapped from surveys and air photos by Japanese Antarctic Research Expedition (JARE), 1957–62, and named Ryugu-misaki (cape of the dragon's palace).
 

Headlands of Queen Maud Land
Prince Olav Coast